It was a Dacian fortified town.

Images

References

 V. Zirra, N. Conovici, G. Trohani, P. Gherghe, P. Alexandrescu, Gh. Gâta, V. V. Zirra, La station fortifiée de "Cetatea Jidovilor" (Cotofenii din Dos, dép. de Dolj), Dacia 37, 1993, 79-157

Dacian fortresses in Dolj County
Historic monuments in Dolj County